Free Shakespeare on the Radio was a radio drama and podcast starring André Holland and Lupita Nyong'o which was produced by WNYC Studios and The Public Theater.

Background 
The performance was originally being produced as a stage performance at the Delacorte Theater as part of the Free Shakespeare in the Park series but was canceled due to the COVID-19 pandemic and was adapted into a radio drama instead. The audio production was produced by WNYC Studios and The Public Theater and stars André Holland and Lupita Nyong'o. The recording was done over Zoom.

Reception 
The show was included on The New York Times list of "5 Podcasts to Bring Theater Into Your Home". The show was included on IndieWire list of "The Podcasts of 2020: A Tribute".

References 

Audio podcasts
2020 podcast debuts
2020 podcast endings
WNYC Studios programs
William Shakespeare